Fockea is a genus of succulent scrubs native to southern Africa. known collectively as water roots, a reference to their characteristic bulbous caudex, which is edible in at least some species.

Taxonomy
The species Fockea multiflora is sister to the other four species, and Fockea angustifolia is sister to the remaining four.

Species 
 Fockea angustifolia K.Schum. - South Africa
 Fockea capensis Endl. - South Africa
 Fockea comaru (E.Mey.) N.E.Br. - South Africa
 Fockea edulis (Thunb.) K.Schum. - South Africa
 Fockea multiflora K.Schum. - South Africa
 Fockea sinuata (E.Mey.) Druce - South Africa

References

 
Apocynaceae genera
Caudiciform plants